Melvin Irwin Gordon (February 18, 1947 – March 22, 2018) was an American professor, director and writer.

Biography
Melvin Irwin Gordon was born on February 18, 1947, in Detroit, Michigan to  leftist parents Rose Gordon (nee Alpert) and Joseph Gordon.
He graduated with a bachelor's degree from University of Michigan and completed his master's and PhD in performance studies from New York University. He taught at the New York University Tisch School of the Arts in the 1970s and 80s before being hired by UC Berkeley, where he taught a popular course on bad acting, in 1990. He also taught courses on the History of Offensive Humor and Method Acting in Hollywood Film.
He died on March 22, 2018, due complications of renal failure.

Works
In 1994, Gordon staged a cabaret show at Bimbo's 365 about Anita Berber, a Weimar era actress, dancer and writer, later writing her biography. Two years later, he staged another cabaret show at the same location about Erik Jan Hanussen, a clairvoyant close to Hitler, also writing his biography later.
Gordon wrote two books on the sexual histories of Berlin and Paris, a book on the history of the Grand Guignol theatre and a two-volume history of the Stanislavski method. He was finishing books about American fascist love cults and flappers at the time of his death.

Archive 
In 2019, the Harry Ransom Center at The University of Texas at Austin announced it had acquired the papers and personal collection of Mel Gordon. Among the papers are original documents relating to American method acting, German cabaret, and the Grand Guignol. Hundreds of rare sound recordings capture performances of vaudeville, early twentieth-century Broadway theatre, and interviews with noted actors and directors.

Bibliography

References

External links
Mel Gordon Papers at the Harry Ransom Center
Mel Gordon at University of California, Berkeley
R.I.P. Mel Gordon at Feral House

1947 births
2018 deaths
20th-century American writers
University of Michigan alumni
New York University alumni
Writers from Detroit
Academics from Michigan
Tisch School of the Arts faculty
University of California, Berkeley faculty
Deaths from kidney failure